Joseph Edward Proctor (born August 10, 1985) is an American mixed martial artist who most recently competed in the welterweight division of the Ultimate Fighting Championship. A professional competitor since 2008, Proctor was also a competitor on The Ultimate Fighter: Live.

Background
Proctor was born in Quincy, Massachusetts, but raised in Pembroke, Massachusetts. He attended the University of Massachusetts Dartmouth. Proctor worked in construction before a friend suggested he try jiu-jitsu. Proctor began training at Lauzon MMA in Bridgewater, Massachusetts, with UFC veteran and submission specialist Joe Lauzon.

Mixed martial arts career

Early career
Proctor held an amateur record of 5-1 before starting his professional career in August 2008, winning his first fight by decision. Over the next three years he amassed a record of 7-1.

The Ultimate Fighter
Proctor was one of 32 Lightweight fighters announced by the UFC to participate in first live season of The Ultimate Fighter reality show.

Proctor won his way into the house when he defeated Jordan Rinaldi by a guillotine choke submission in the first round. With that victory, he was chosen as the fourth pick by Team Faber.

Proctor won his next match against Team Cruz's seventh pick, Chris Tickle. He defeated Tickle with a rear-naked choke submission near the end of the first round, gaining entry into the quarter-finals.

For his quarter-final fight, Proctor was matched up with striking specialist James Vick. Proctor was unable to take Vick down in the fight and was outmatched on the feet. Proctor lost the fight by unanimous decision after the second round, thus eliminating him from the competition.

Ultimate Fighting Championship
Proctor made his UFC debut against fellow cast member Jeremy Larsen on June 1, 2012, at The Ultimate Fighter 15 Finale.  He won the fight via TKO due to a combination of a knee and punches in the first round.

Proctor next faced Ramsey Nijem on December 8, 2012, at UFC on Fox 5. He lost the fight via unanimous decision.

Proctor was expected to face Al Iaquinta on April 27, 2013, at UFC 159.  However, the bout was scrapped as both fighters sustained training injuries leading up to the fight.

Proctor faced Cristiano Marcello on February 15, 2014, at UFC Fight Night 36. He won the fight via unanimous decision.

Proctor faced Justin Salas on July 16, 2014, at UFC Fight Night 45. Proctor won the bout via second-round TKO.

Proctor faced Yancy Medeiros on December 12, 2014, at The Ultimate Fighter 20 Finale. He lost the fight via submission in the first round after being dropping with a spinning back kick to the body.

Proctor faced Justin Edwards on June 6, 2015, at UFC Fight Night 68. He won the back-and-forth fight via submission with just seconds remaining in the final round, resulting in the latest submission win in the UFC Lightweight division.

Proctor faced Magomed Mustafaev on December 12, 2015, at UFC 194. He lost the fight via TKO in the first round.

Proctor was expected to face Erik Koch on May 29, 2016, at UFC Fight Night 88. However, Proctor pulled out of the fight on April 21 citing injury and was replaced by Shane Campbell.

Proctor faced Bryan Barberena on April 22, 2017, at UFC Fight Night 108. He lost the fight via TKO in the first round and was subsequently released from the promotion.

Championships and accomplishments

Mixed martial arts
Reality Fighting
RF Lightweight Championship (One time)
American Fighting Organization
AFO Lightweight Championship (One time)

Mixed martial arts record

|-
|Loss
|align=center|11–5
|Bryan Barberena
|TKO (knees and punches)
|UFC Fight Night: Swanson vs. Lobov
|
|align=center|1
|align=center|1:34
|Nashville, Tennessee, United States
|
|-
|Loss
|align=center|11–4
|Magomed Mustafaev
|TKO (knees and punches)
|UFC 194
|
|align=center|1
|align=center|1:54
|Las Vegas, Nevada, United States
|   
|-
|Win
|align=center|11–3
|Justin Edwards
|Technical Submission (guillotine choke)
|UFC Fight Night: Boetsch vs. Henderson
|
|align=center|3
|align=center|4:58
|New Orleans, Louisiana, United States
|
|-
|Loss
|align=center|10–3
|Yancy Medeiros
| Submission (guillotine choke)
| The Ultimate Fighter: A Champion Will Be Crowned Finale
| 
|align=center| 1
|align=center| 4:37
|Las Vegas, Nevada, United States
|
|-
|Win
|align=center|10–2
|Justin Salas
| TKO (punches)
| UFC Fight Night: Cowboy vs. Miller
| 
|align=center| 2
|align=center| 3:27
|Atlantic City, New Jersey, United States
|
|-
|Win
|align=center|9–2
|Cristiano Marcello
|Decision (unanimous)
|UFC Fight Night: Machida vs. Mousasi
|
|align=center|3
|align=center|5:00
|Jaraguá do Sul, Brazil
|
|-
|Loss
|align=center|8–2
|Ramsey Nijem
|Decision (unanimous)
|UFC on Fox: Henderson vs. Diaz
|
|align=center|3
|align=center|5:00
|Seattle, Washington, United States
|
|-
|Win
|align=center|8–1
|Jeremy Larsen
|KO (knee and punches)
|The Ultimate Fighter: Live Finale
|
|align=center|1
|align=center|1:59
|Las Vegas, Nevada, United States
|
|-
|Win
|align=center|7–1
|Matt Bessette
|Decision (unanimous)
|Reality Fighting: Gonzaga vs. Porter
|
|align=center|5
|align=center|5:00
|Uncasville, Connecticut, United States
|
|-
|Win
|align=center|6–1
|Oz Pariser
|Decision (unanimous)
|Reality Fighting: Mohegan Sun
|
|align=center|3
|align=center|5:00
|Uncasville, Connecticut, United States
|
|-
|Win
|align=center|5–1
|Eric Fama
|Submission (guillotine choke)
|Reality Fighting: Mohegan Sun
|
|align=center|2
|align=center|3:22
|Uncasville, Connecticut, United States
|
|-
|Loss
|align=center|4–1
|Luis Felix
|TKO (punches)
|AFO: Thanksgiving Massacre 3
|
|align=center|2
|align=center|2:24
|Mansfield, Massachusetts, United States
|
|-
|Win
|align=center|4–0
|Nelson Gaipo
|Submission (guillotine choke)
|AFO: Summer Brawl
|
|align=center|1
|align=center|1:14
|Mansfield, Massachusetts, United States
|
|-
|Win
|align=center|3–0
|Matt Casio
|Submission (armbar)
|AFO: Night of Champions 2
|
|align=center|3
|align=center|5:00
|Plymouth, Massachusetts, United States
|
|-
|Win
|align=center|2–0
|Will Seaver
|Submission (rear-naked choke)
|FFP: Untamed 30
|
|align=center|1
|align=center|1:33
|Westport, Massachusetts, United States
|
|-
|Win
|align=center|1–0
|Joe DeChaves
|Decision (split)
|Reality Fighting: Ferocity
|
|align=center|3
|align=center|4:00
|Plymouth, Massachusetts, United States
|

Mixed martial arts exhibition record

|-
|Loss
|align=center|2–1
| James Vick
| Decision (unanimous)
| The Ultimate Fighter: Live
| (airdate)
|align=center|2
|align=center|5:00
|Las Vegas, Nevada, United States
|
|-
|Win
|align=center|2–0
| Chris Tickle
| Submission (rear-naked choke)
| The Ultimate Fighter: Live
| (airdate)
|align=center|1
|align=center|4:42
|Las Vegas, Nevada, United States
|
|-
|Win
|align=center|1–0
| Jordan Rinaldi
| Submission (guillotine choke) 
| The Ultimate Fighter: Live
| (airdate)
|align=center|1
|align=center|2:08
|Las Vegas, Nevada, United States
|
|-

See also
 List of current UFC fighters
 List of male mixed martial artists

References

External links
 
 

American male mixed martial artists
Mixed martial artists utilizing Brazilian jiu-jitsu
Living people
People from Pembroke, Massachusetts
1985 births
Sportspeople from Plymouth County, Massachusetts
University of Massachusetts Dartmouth alumni
Ultimate Fighting Championship male fighters
American practitioners of Brazilian jiu-jitsu